Joseph Louis Tauro (September 26, 1931 – November 30, 2018) was a United States district judge of the United States District Court for the District of Massachusetts. He was the son of the late Massachusetts Chief Justice G. Joseph Tauro.

Education and career

Born in Winchester, Massachusetts in 1931, Tauro received an Artium Baccalaureus degree from Brown University in 1953 and a Bachelor of Laws from Cornell Law School in 1956. He was a First Lieutenant in the United States Army from 1956 to 1958, and was an Assistant United States Attorney for the District of Massachusetts from 1959 to 1960. He was in private practice in Boston and Lynn, Massachusetts from 1960 to 1971. He was a chief legal counsel to the Governor of Massachusetts, John A. Volpe, from 1965 to 1968. He was the United States Attorney for the District of Massachusetts in 1972.

Federal judicial service

On September 12, 1972, Tauro was nominated by President Richard Nixon to a seat on the United States District Court for the District of Massachusetts vacated by Judge Francis Ford. Tauro was confirmed by the United States Senate on October 12, 1972, and received his commission on October 17, 1972. He served as Chief Judge from 1992 to 1999. Tauro took senior status effective September 26, 2013, retaining approximately a 60% caseload with a focus on criminal cases. Until taking senior status, Tauro was the longest-serving active judge appointed by Nixon. Tauro died on November 30, 2018, at his home in Marblehead, Massachusetts.

Notable cases

On July 8, 2010, in the cases of Gill v. Office of Personnel Management and Massachusetts v. United States Department of Health and Human Services, Tauro issued decisions holding unconstitutional that part of the federal Defense of Marriage Act that defined marriage "as a legal union exclusively between one man and one woman." Those decisions were affirmed by the United States Court of Appeals for the First Circuit, and certiorari was denied after the Supreme Court issued its opinion in United States v. Windsor. In a lawsuit under NEPA involving possible radiations dangers from the original 1978 Pave Paws on Cape Cod he offered the plaintiffs a guided tour of the facility so they could see for themselves how "safe" it was.

References

Sources
 
 Gill v. OPM, 1:09-cv-10309-JLT, (D.Mass. July 8, 2010), at 38.  Available at online
 Mass. v. US Dept. Available online

1931 births
2018 deaths
People from Winchester, Massachusetts
Military personnel from Massachusetts
Brown University alumni
Cornell Law School alumni
United States Attorneys for the District of Massachusetts
Judges of the United States District Court for the District of Massachusetts
United States district court judges appointed by Richard Nixon
20th-century American judges
United States Army officers
Assistant United States Attorneys